Bertine Spijkerman (born 31 May 1982) is a road cyclist from Netherlands. She won the bronze medal at the 2000 UCI Road World Championships in the women's junior time trial.

References

External links
 
 
 
 
 

1982 births
Living people
Dutch female cyclists
People from Sneek
Cyclists from Friesland
20th-century Dutch women
21st-century Dutch women